Washington Irving Lincoln Adams (February 22, 1865- January 20, 1946) was an American Republican Party politician, banker and soldier.

Biography
Washington I. L. Adams was a direct descendant of Henry Adams, who settled in Braintree, Massachusetts in 1636, and also of Presidents John Adams and John Quincy Adams.

He was a founder and President of the Montclair Trust Company, the Murray Hill Trust Company, and the West Side Bank of New York.  He served as President of Styles & Cash, a New York City printing and stationery firm.

In 1912, Adams was the Republican nominee for the U.S. House of Representatives in New Jersey's 10th congressional district.  The incumbent, Democrat Edward W. Townsend, had been elected to Congress in the 1910 Democratic landslide that helped Woodrow Wilson win election as Governor of New Jersey.  Townsend was re-elected in 1912 (with Wilson running for President) with 10,854 votes, with former Assemblyman William F. Morgan (running as a Progressive with Theodore Roosevelt) receiving 7,847 votes.  Adams (on a ticket with William Howard Taft finished third with 7,111 votes.

During World War I, Adams, at the age of 52, was commissioned a Major in the U.S. Army and was the Officer In Charge of Finance for the Eastern Division, Quartermaster Corps.

Adams was a member of the Electoral College in 1916, voting for Charles Evans Hughes, and was an unsuccessful candidate for Elector in 1932.  In 1932, Adams was elected Town Commissioner in Montclair, New Jersey and served until 1936.

Adams was a member of the Sons of the American Revolution and served as its President General from 1922 until 1923.

References

External links
 

American bank presidents
American business executives
New Jersey Republicans
United States Army officers
People from Montclair, New Jersey
1865 births
1946 deaths
Sons of the American Revolution
Military personnel from New Jersey